Blue Bird K4 was a powerboat commissioned in 1939 by Sir Malcolm Campbell, to rival the Americans' efforts in the fight for the world water speed record.

The name "K4" was derived from its Lloyd's unlimited rating, and was carried in a prominent circular badge on the forward hull. As this was Campbell's second boat, it was also known as Blue Bird II. He used the name for a series of land speed record cars, his record boats and also his motor yacht.

K4 was built by Vosper & Company as a replacement for Blue Bird K3, which had set three other water speed records for Malcolm Campbell before the K4 was built. It also used the same Rolls-Royce R engine.

Design 
K4 was a three-point hydroplane. Conventional planing powerboats, such as Miss England or Blue Bird K3, have a single keel, with an indent or "step" projecting from the bottom of the hull. At speed, the force on this step is enough to lift the bow upward, reducing the wetted surface area of the hull and thus also the frictional drag. A "three pointer" has two distinctly separate floats fitted to the front, and a third point at the rear of the hull. When the boat increases in speed, most of the hull lifts out of the water and planes on these three contact points alone. These points, being even smaller in area than the planing hull of a monohull hydroplane, have even less drag. Having a broad spacing between the front planing points, the three-pointer is less susceptible to instability caused by small disturbances than is a monohull. However, if the bow lifts beyond its safety margin, the aerodynamic forces (not the hydrodynamic forces of the water) on the broad forward area of the hull will cause it to "kite" upwards, leading to a somersault and crash. This is what happened to both Slo-mo-shun and (possibly) Bluebird K7.

Records 
K4 set one world water speed record on 19 August 1939 on Coniston Water, Lancashire (now in Cumbria, at 141.740 mph (228.108 km/h or 123.168 kn).

Jet engine trials 
After the Second World War, Sir Malcolm unsuccessfully re-engined K4 with a de Havilland Goblin turbojet engine but did not gain any records. The new superstructure did gain the nickname  'The Coniston Slipper' .

Donald Campbell 

Donald Campbell (Malcolm's son) had not previously attempted record-breaking, but after Sir Malcolm's death at the end of 1948, the threat of an American challenge to his water speed record spurred him to defend it. Under the terms of his will, Sir Malcolm's possessions, including the record breakers, were auctioned off and Donald was forced to buy them back. K4 was then re-engined with a propeller and one of the previous Rolls-Royce R engines.

Donald tried the boat but deemed it too slow; after another superstructure rebuild, and a final structural failure in 1951, it was replaced by the jet-powered Bluebird K7, in which Donald set several records, then died during a final record attempt in 1967.

A replica of K4 currently is on show at the Lakeland Motor Museum, Backbarrow.

References

Sources

External links 
Lakeland Motor Museum
 

Bluebird record-breaking vehicles
Water speed records
Jet-powered hydroplanes
Hydroplanes
Maritime incidents in 1951